Constance Ferguson (née Masilo; born 10 June 1970) is a South African based Botswana actress, filmmaker, producer and businesswoman. She is best known for her role as "Karabo Moroka" on South Africa's most popular soap opera, Generations. She starred on the show from its start in 1994 until she exited in 2010. In 2014, she reprised her role on the show after a 4-year absence for a short term. Ferguson was on the cover of Forbes Woman Africa magazine in 2018.

Career

Generations (1994–2010; 2014-2016) 
In 1994, she began acting a main role of Karabo Moroka, the wife of Tau Mogale and sister to Archie Moroka, in the most popular South African soap opera, Generations. She starred alongside Menzi Ngubane, Slindile Nodangala and Sophie Ndaba. In 2010, after playing the lead role of Karabo Moroka for 16 years, Connie announced her departure from Generations "to purse other career options". Ferguson left Generations on a good note as she returned to the soapie four years later to help relaunch Generations: The Legacy.

The Wild (2010–2013)
After her 2010 departure from Generations, she went on to star in the lead role of the M-Net telenovela The Wild, which was shot at an exotic South African game farm. She co-starred with her real-life husband until its cancellation in April 2013.

Ferguson Films (2010–present) 
Connie and her husband, Shona, launched the television company Ferguson Films in 2010. Their first production, Rockville, was commissioned by M-Net three years later. Other productions include iGazi, The Gift, The Throne, The Queen and The Imposter. The couple often appear in their own productions; for example, Connie plays the role of Harriet Khoza on The Queen.

The Queen was nominated in several categories at the South African Film and Television Awards in 2018.

Ferguson launched a fragrance called True Self in 2008, and a lotion in 2014.

Personal life 
Ferguson (then Masilo) married fellow actor Neo Matsunyane in 1993. In December 1992, they welcomed a daughter. They divorced in 1998, after five years of marriage.

In July 2001, Ferguson met actor Shona Ferguson. In November 2001, three years after her divorce with Matsunyane, they married. In June 2002, the couple welcomed a daughter. After nearly 20 years of marriage, Shona Ferguson died in the afternoon of 30 July 2021 from COVID-19-related complications.

Filmography

Personal Image

References

External links 
 
 

1970 births
Living people
People from Kimberley, Northern Cape
Tswana people
South African actresses